Durham Gospel Fragment may refer to any of three manuscripts now housed in the library at Durham Cathedral.

Gospel Book Fragment (Durham Cathedral Library, A. II. 10.)
Gospel Book Fragment (Durham Cathedral Library, A. II. 16.)
The Durham Gospels (MS A. II. 17)